Michael Jon "Mike" Rothwell (born June 30, 1953) is an American sailor. He won a silver medal in the Tornado class with David McFaull at the 1976 Summer Olympics in Montreal, Quebec, Canada.

Rothwell was born in Honolulu, Hawaii.

References
 

1953 births
Living people
Sportspeople from Honolulu
American male sailors (sport)
Sailors at the 1976 Summer Olympics – Tornado
Olympic silver medalists for the United States in sailing
Medalists at the 1976 Summer Olympics